Says You! is a word game quiz show that airs weekly in the United States on public radio stations. Richard Sher created the show in 1996 with the guiding philosophy: "It's not important to KNOW the answers: it's important to LIKE the answers." The first episode to broadcast on radio took place in Cambridge, Massachusetts in February 1997.

Recorded in front of live audiences in theaters around the United States, the show is produced in Boston, Massachusetts. Its format, emphasis on witty repartee, and its tagline—"a game of bluff and bluster, words and whimsy"—are reminiscent of the similarly long-running BBC program My Word! (1956–1990). The first ten seasons of Says You! aired in a half hour timeslot before expanding to one hour in 2006. Season 21 of Says You! marked the show's 500th episode.

Richard Sher hosted Says You!'''s first eighteen seasons, before passing away on February 9, 2015. Original panelist Barry Nolan took over as host for the next two seasons, before returning to his seat as a panelist in early 2017. He was replaced as host by occasional panelist Gregg Porter of Seattle's KUOW-FM, with author/public radio contributor Dave Zobel (who came on as a Says You! writer after Sher's death) frequently guest hosting in 2018 & 2019 when Porter was absent or returning as a panelist. Porter left Says You! in the summer of 2019, with Zobel serving as permanent host until the end of season 25. Richard Sher's son Ben (who voiced the episode-ending Pipit & Finch credit as a child and later served as a guest scorekeeper) hosted the final first-run episodes in September 2022.

The COVID-19 pandemic forced taping for season 24 to conclude earlier than expected, with the last first-run episode with a live audience airing from Palo Alto, California on May 1st, 2020. The remainder of the season and the entirety of season 25 consisted of new episodes recorded via Zoom or without a live audience, supplemented by reruns as well as twenty-one "Back 9" episodes, featuring 9 rounds taken from three episodes apiece of early half-hour seasons. The final four first-run episodes featured a remote audience of ticket-buyers watching from home, with the last of these airing on August 13th, 2021, with the season concluding primarily with "Back 9" re-airings.

At the end of the 25th season, executive producer Laura Sher announced that production was ending and further seasons would consist of rebroadcasts.  Season 26 premiered on October 8th, 2021, and consisted of repeats from the show's eighth & ninth seasons, with Season 27 in 2022-23 featuring episodes from the tenth-twelfth seasons, Richard Sher's final episode from season 18, and unedited half hour episodes. Two final live episodes with studio audiences were held in Seattle & San Francisco at the start of season 27, featuring most of the original panelists and Richard Sher's son Ben as host, but have not yet been aired on the radio.

Over 250 episodes can be heard for free on-demand via Public Radio Exchange, including all first-run and Back 9 episodes from seasons 18-25, and all of the succeeding seasons' reruns. Says You!'s official website posts new episodes on a one week delay from PRX, while also selling over 370 episodes from seasons 1-6 and 11-20 in their online store.

 Format 
The show features a regular group of panelists—the cast—divided into two three-person teams. The two teams are made up of the show’s original cast members and occasional guest players. Teams answer a series of questions to earn up to ten points for each correct—or humorously suitable—answer. As the host provides more clues, and/or panelists get extra help from their teammates, fewer points are awarded, while partially correct or objectively humorous responses may also receive lesser points. Score-keepers (usually children or teenagers) keep track of the score of each game.

 Rounds of the game 
Rounds 1, 3, and 5 vary from week to week and consist of signature categories such as "What's the Difference?", "Odd Man Out", "Melded Movies", and "Common Threads", as well as a variety of miscellaneous literary wordplay. Typically, six questions per round are asked, one aimed at each individual panelist, though assistance and interjections from their teammates are common. The host traditionally advises listeners to grab a pen & paper to play along with the teams, as "that's how we do it here". On occasion, that week's musical guest aids in a game themed around song lyrics, typically played as the final round. Some rounds reflected the culture, community names, and history of the location of that taping.

Rounds 2 and 4 are the Bluffing Rounds. Similar to the game show Liar's Club and the radio show Call My Bluff, the three members of one team are given an obscure word (e.g. cacafuego); one of them gets the actual definition, and the other two must bluff with fake definitions composed during a brief musical interlude, traditionally provided by a live musical guest. The other team attempts to determine the correct definition from the three presented. Ten points are awarded for guessing or bluffing successfully. Select early episodes instead featured a "Biofictionary" round, where teams had to guess the claim to fame of a person rather than a word's definition.

Hour-long episodes often feature a "Spotlight Round", highlighting memorable rounds from earlier seasons, often suggested by listeners. Following host Richard Sher's death in 2015, Spotlight Rounds were often picked to honour him.

Through the show's website, people could suggest questions and segments for the show, with frequent contributors nicknamed as "Says You! Hall of Famers".Radio broadcast listening schedule

 Players 

 Hosts 
 Richard Sher (creator, producer, host from 1996 to 2015)
 Barry Nolan (host from 2015 to 2017; regular panelist in other seasons)
 Gregg Porter (host from 2017 to 2019; recurring panelist from 2015 to 2018)
 Dave Zobel (host from 2019 to 2021, frequent guest host from 2017 to 2019; question writer from 2015-2021)
 Ben Sher (host in 2022, former scorekeeper; son of Richard Sher)

 Original panelists 

 Francine Achbar
 Carolyn Faye Fox
 Tony Kahn
 Paula Lyons (wife of Arnie Reisman)
 Barry Nolan (host from 2015 to 2017; husband of Garland Waller)
 Arnie Reisman (husband of Paula Lyons)

Episodes usually featured Carolyn Faye Fox, Arnie Reisman, and Paula Lyons on the "stereo left" team and Tony Kahn, Francine Achbar, and Barry Nolan on the "stereo right" team, with substitutions for panelist unavailability where needed. Crossovers between these pairings on the same team only happened on rare occasions. During Barry Nolan's two seasons as host of Says You!'', Murray Horwitz took his place as a regular panelist in most episodes, and remained a regular after Barry returned to the panel.

Regular and featured panelists 
 Pat Bagley, editorial cartoonist
 May Berenbaum, entemologist
 Tom Bergeron, television host
 Tim Brooks, historian
 Callie Crossley, journalist & radio host
 Alan Dershowitz, Harvard professor and lawyer
 Walter Egan, musician
 Norman Gilliland, radio producer
 Deb Hiett (regular panelist in seasons 24-25; recurring panelist in seasons 22-23)
 Murray Horwitz (regular panelist in seasons 19-25; recurring panelist in earlier seasons)
 Philip Klinkner, political scientist
 Joyce Kuhwalik (regular panelist in season 25)
 Paul Magid (regular panelist in season 25; recurring panelist in seasons 23-24)
 Wendie Malick, actress
 Constance McCashin, psychotherapist & actress; wife of Sam Weisman
 Erin McKean, founder of Wordnik
 Phil Proctor, member of the Firesign Theatre
 Ammon Shea, writer
 Jimmy Tingle, political humorist
 Garland Waller, professor; wife of Barry Nolan
 Sam Weisman, film director; husband of Constance McCashin
 Robin Young, radio host

Writers 
 Nat Segaloff
 Dave Zobel

Notes

American radio game shows
1990s American game shows
2000s American game shows
2010s American game shows
1996 radio programme debuts
NPR programs